The Cancello–Avellino railway is a railway line in Campania, Italy.

The first section of the line, between Cancello and Nola, was opened in 1846 while the last section between Montoro Inferiore and Avellino was completed in 1879.

See also 
 List of railway lines in Italy

References

Bibliography 
 RFI - Fascicolo linea 128

Railway lines in Campania
Railway lines opened in 1846
1846 establishments in Italy